In Tune may refer to Musical tuning.

It may also refer to:

In Tune (film), a 1914 American silent film
In Tune Monthly, an American music magazine
In Tune (album), a 1971 jazz album by The Oscar Peterson Trio and The Singers Unlimited
In Tune (radio programme), a BBC Radio 3 music magazine programme hosted by Sean Rafferty
Microsoft Intune, a data management software 
Toyota Entune, a satellite navigation system for Toyota automobiles